Wikimedia Commons (or simply Commons) is a media repository of free-to-use images, sounds, videos and other media. It is a project of the Wikimedia Foundation.

Files from Wikimedia Commons can be used across all of the Wikimedia projects in all languages, including Wikipedia, Wikivoyage, Wikisource, Wikiquote, Wiktionary, Wikinews, Wikibooks, and Wikispecies, or downloaded for offsite use. As of February 2023, the repository contains over 90 million free-to-use media files, managed and editable by registered volunteers.

History 

The idea for the project came from Erik Möller in March 2004 and Wikimedia Commons was started on September 7, 2004. In July 2013, the number of edits on Commons reached 100,000,000. Since 2018 it became possible to upload 3D models to the site. One of the first models uploaded to Commons was a reconstruction of the Asad Al-Lat statue which was destroyed in Palmyra by the ISIL in 2015.

Various notable organizations had uploaded files to Commons. In 2012, the National Archives and Records Administration uploaded 100,000 digitised images from its collection. In 2020, the Digital Public Library of America (DPLA) started uploading its collections to Commons. In 2022, DPLA uploaded more than 2 million files. Similarly Europeana, the website aggregating European cultural heritage, shares its digitised images through Commons. During the COVID-19 pandemic, as part of a collaboration with Wikimedia, the World Health Organization (WHO) uploaded its "Mythbusters" infographics to Commons.

Relation to sister projects 
The stated aim of Wikimedia Commons is to provide a media file repository "that makes available public domain and freely-licensed educational media content to all, and that acts as a common repository for the various projects of the Wikimedia Foundation." The expression "educational" is to be understood according to its broad meaning of "providing knowledge; instructional or informative".

Most Wikimedia projects still allow local uploads which are not visible to other projects or languages, but this option is meant to be used primarily for material (such as fair use content) which local project policies allow, but which would not be permitted according to the copyright policy of Commons. Wikimedia Commons itself does not allow fair use or uploads under non-free licenses, including licenses which restrict commercial use of materials or disallow derivative works. For this reason, Wikimedia Commons always hosts freely licensed media and deletes copyright violations. Licenses that are acceptable include the Creative Commons Attribution and Attribution/ShareAlike licenses, other free content and free software licenses, and the public domain.

The default language for Commons is English, but registered users can customize their interface to use any other available user interface translations. Many content pages, in particular policy pages and portals, have also been translated into various languages. Files on Wikimedia Commons are categorized using MediaWiki's category system. In addition, they are often collected on individual topical gallery pages. While the project was originally proposed to also contain free text files, these continue to be hosted on a sister project, Wikisource.

Controversial content 
The site has been criticized for hosting large amounts of amateur pornography, often uploaded by exhibitionists who exploit the site for personal gratification, and who are enabled by sympathetic administrators. In 2012, BuzzFeed described Wikimedia Commons as "littered with dicks".

In 2010, Wikipedia co-founder Larry Sanger reported Wikimedia Commons to the FBI for hosting sexualized images of children known as "lolicon". After this was reported in the media, Jimmy Wales, founder of the Wikimedia Foundation which hosts Commons, used his administrator status to delete several images without discussion from the Commons community. Wales responded to the backlash from the Commons community by voluntarily relinquishing some site privileges, including the ability to delete files.

Utilities 
Over time, additional functionality has been developed to interface Wikimedia Commons with the other Wikimedia projects. Daniel Kinzler wrote applications for finding appropriate categories for uploaded files ("CommonSense"), determining the usage of files across the Wikimedia projects ("CheckUsage"), locating images with missing copyright information ("UntaggedImages"), and relaying information about administrative actions such as deletions to the relevant wikis ("").

Specialized uploading tools and scripts such as "Commonist" have been created to simplify the process of uploading large numbers of files. At one time, in order to review free content photos uploaded to Flickr, users could participate in a now-defunct collaborative external review process (""), which resulted in more than 10,000 uploads to Wikimedia There exists a community-maintained Commons Mobile App which allows uploading of photos that document the world, especially notable objects findable in the map in the Nearby List in the app (displaying Wikidata items with coordinates). The app launched in 2012 as an official Wikimedia app and since May 2016, it uses the official Wikimedia Commons name and logo.

Structured Data on Commons 

Structured Data on Commons (SDC) is a three-year software development project funded by the Sloan Foundation to provide the infrastructure for Wikimedia Commons volunteers to organize data about media files in a consistent manner. This data is structured more and is made machine-readable. The goals of the functionality are to make contributing to Commons easier by providing new ways to edit, curate, and write software for Commons, and to make general use of Commons easier by expanding capabilities in search and reuse.

Quality 

There are three mechanisms on the site for recognizing high-quality works. One is known as "Featured pictures", where works are nominated and other community members vote to accept or reject the nomination. This process began in November 2004. Another process known as "Quality images" began in June 2006, and has a simpler nomination process comparable to "Featured pictures". "Quality images" only accepts works created by Wikimedia users, whereas "Featured pictures" additionally accepts nominations of works by third parties such as NASA. A third image assessment project, known as "Valued images", began on June 1, 2008, with the purpose of recognizing "the most valued illustration of its kind", in contrast to the other two processes which assess images mainly on technical quality.

The three mentioned processes select a slight part (less than 0.1%) from the total number of files. However, Commons collects files of all quality levels, from the most professional level across simple documental and amateur files up to files of very poor quality. Generally, Commons is not a competition but a collection; a quality of the description and organization of files and their descriptive and informational benefits are often more relevant than technical or artistic perfection of the files. Files with specific defects can be tagged for improvement and warning or even proposed for deletion but there exists no process of systematic rating of all files.

The site held its inaugural "Picture of the Year" competition in 2006. All images that were made a Featured picture during 2006 were eligible, and voted on by eligible Wikimedia movement members during two rounds of voting. The winning picture was a picture of the Aurora Borealis over snowlands, taken by an airman from the U.S. Air Force. The competition has since become an annual event.

Wikimedia Commons Pictures of the Year
The Commons Picture of the Year (POTY) is a competition that was first run in 2006. It aims to identify the best freely licensed images from those that during the year have been awarded Featured picture status.

These are the images which have won each year's POTY:

Content figures 

Source: commons:Commons:Milestones
 November 30, 2006: 1 million media files
 September 2, 2009: 5 million media files
 April 15, 2011: 10 million media files
 December 4, 2012: 15 million media files
 July 14, 2013: 100,000,000 edits
 January 25, 2014: 20 million media files
 January 13, 2016: 30 million media files
 June 21, 2017: 40 million media files
 October 7, 2018: 50 million media files
 March 18, 2020: 60 million media files
 February 15, 2021: 70 million media files
 January 11, 2022: 80 million media files
 January 10, 2023: 90 million media files
 Current figures: commons:Special:Statistics

See also 
 Creative Commons – an organization providing a set of content licenses and a directory of works using them
 Internet Archive – an online collection of videos, documents and webpages
 Project Gutenberg – the largest freely accessible collection of documents (including books and sheet music)
 Reporting of child pornography images on Wikimedia Commons

References

External links 

 
 Mirror of Wikimedia Commons by WikiTeam

Advertising-free websites
Articles containing video clips
Free content
Image-sharing websites
Internet properties established in 2004
MediaWiki websites
Multilingual websites
Open content projects
Photo archives
Stock photography
Video hosting
Wikimedia projects
Stock media